Schlehdorf is a municipality in the district of Bad Tölz-Wolfratshausen in Bavaria in Germany. Schlehdorf Abbey is located there.

References

Bad Tölz-Wolfratshausen